Sidi Abdelmoumen may refer to,
Sidi Abdelmoumen, Algeria
Sidi Abdelmoumen, Morocco